Pectinivalva primigena is a moth of the family Nepticulidae. It is found along the south-eastern coast of New South Wales, Australia.

The wingspan is about 4.3 mm for females.

Meyrick beat the single known specimen from Banksia sermta and thought this was probably the host-plant. He also stated that he found nepticulid larvae on this plant, but failed to rear them. Moore (1966) illustrated vacated mines on Banksia sermta and Banksia integrifolia, which he believed belonged to nepticulids. However, search in a number of localities during 1995 has failed to reveal any unequivocal sign of nepticulids on Banksia or any other genus of Proteaceae. Vacated mines on Banksia sermta, identical to those illustrated by Moore, have been found in two localities, but they are considered unlikely to belong to Nepticulidae as the commencement of the linear mine is uncharacteristically broad, and the egg appears to be injected into the leaf tissues, and is not visible on the surface.  No Pectinivalva has yet been reared from any family of plants other than Myrtaceae. The host plant is thus unknown, but probably a Myrtaceae species. Most likely, they mine the leaves of their host plant.

External links
Australian Faunal Directory
Australian Nepticulidae (Lepidoptera): Redescription of the named species

Moths of Australia
Nepticulidae
Moths described in 1906
Taxa named by Edward Meyrick